The whiskered treeswift (Hemiprocne comata) is a species of bird in the family Hemiprocnidae. It is the smallest of 4 species in genus Hemiprocne and is found in Brunei, Indonesia, Malaysia, Myanmar, the Philippines, Singapore, and Thailand. 

Its natural habitats are subtropical or tropical moist lowland forest, subtropical or tropical mangrove forest, and subtropical or tropical moist montane forest.

Description 
medium, unique white elongated 'whiskers' above and below eye, shaggy crest, deeply forked tail, sexes similar. male lores black; 2 elongated white 'whiskers,' 1 above eye from forehead extending past nape; ear chestnut; rest of head and throat, tail, upper and underwing coverts, and primaries dark metallic blue; each secondary has a large white spot on inner web; back to uppertail coverts, breast and upper belly bronze olive; lower belly and undertail coverts white. female lacks chestnut ear. imm plumage not known. bill black; eye dark brown; legs purplish brown.

Gallery

References 

 A Guide to the birds of the philippines(2000) Robert S. Kennedy pedro C. Gonzales, Edward C, Dickinson Hector C. Miranda, jr. & Timothy H. Fisher

whiskered treeswift
Birds of Malesia
whiskered treeswift
Taxonomy articles created by Polbot